The gens Obultronia was an obscure plebeian family at Rome.  Most members of this gens are known only from inscriptions, especially a group from Casinum in Latium, and another from Salona in Dalmatia.

Members

 Obultronia, erected a monument to Obultronius Lyrasus.
 Aulus Obultronius Beryllus, named in an inscription from Salona in Dalmatia.
 Obultronia Concordia, buried in Dalmatia, aged seven.
 Obultronia Corinthia, the foster-mother of Publius Coelius Quintianus, a child buried at Salona, aged three years and nine months.
 Marcus Obultronius Cultellus, praefectus fabrum, named in a dedicatory inscription from Casinum, addressed to the divine Claudius.
 Marcus Obultronius M. f. Cultellus, possibly the same as the prefect, was one of the duumvirs at Casinum.
 Obultronius Eucarpus, erected a monument to his daughter, Concordia.
 Obultronia Fortunata, the sister of Clodius Zoillus, buried at Salona, aged thirty-two.
 Aulus Obultronius Gratus, one of the severi Mercuriales at Narona in Dalmatia.
 Aulus Obultronius Hermias, erected a monument to his son at Salona.
 Obultronius A. f. Hermias, buried at Salona.
 Obultronius Lyrasus, buried at Rome, aged eighteen.
 Obultronia Nicia, named in an inscription from Salona.
 Obultronia Prisca, the mother of Lucius Staldius Priscus, one of the duumvirs of Casinum.
 Obultronia M. l. Romana, a freedwoman named in an inscription from Salona.
 Obultronius Sabinus, quaestor aerarii in AD 56.  Helvidius Priscus, One of the tribunes of the plebs, carried on a private feud with Sabinus, accusing him of misappropriating treasury funds, resulting in the emperor Nero giving this traditional responsibility of the quaestors to a group of prefects. In AD 68, Sabinus was unjustly put to death by Galba in Spain.

Footnotes

See also
 List of Roman gentes

References

Bibliography
 Publius Cornelius Tacitus, Annales, Historiae.
 Dictionary of Greek and Roman Biography and Mythology, William Smith, ed., Little, Brown and Company, Boston (1849).
 Paul von Rohden, Elimar Klebs, & Hermann Dessau, Prosopographia Imperii Romani (The Prosopography of the Roman Empire, abbreviated PIR), Berlin (1898).

Roman gentes